Uthaman is a 2001 Indian Malayalam-language drama film directed by Anil - Babu and written by T. A. Razzaq, starring Jayaram, Sindhu Menon, Sangeetha, Babu Antony and Siddique. The music was composed by Johnson.

Plot
Uthaman, an orphan, puts his life in jeopardy when he accepts the blame for a murder committed by a member of the family he is living with. Soon, the siblings of the deceased decide to seek revenge.

Cast

 Jayaram as Uthaman
 Siddique as S.I Jayaraj
 Kaviyoor Ponnamma as Jayaraj's Mother
 Sindhu Menon as Gouri
 Sangeetha as Devika
 Innocent as A.S.I Cheriyan		
 KPAC Lalitha as Gouri's Mother
 Nedumudi Venu as Kochantony
 Babu Antony as Pulimuttathu Sunny Thomas 
 Meghanathan as Pulimuttathu Alexi Thomas 
 Baburaj as Ashokan
 CI Paul as Jayaraj's Uncle
 Indrans as Head Contable Ismayil
 Kochu Preman as Head Constable Pilla
 Machan Varghese as Manikandan
 Kozhikode Narayanan Nair as Beeranikka
 Zeenath as Saramma (Cheriyan's Wife)
 Kannur Sreelatha

Soundtrack 
The film's soundtrack contains 5 songs, all composed by Johnson and lyrics by Kaithapram.

References

External links

2001 films
Films shot in Palakkad
2000s Malayalam-language films